TV4ME Philippines is the first and only lifestyle multi-channel network (MCN) in the Philippines. It has 12 channels with original, short-form content around food, health, travel, fashion, celebrity, and home style. It also provides programs from the Outdoor Channel and History Channel.

TV4ME is run by Brand New Media Philippines, which is a joint venture between Brand New Media and MediaQuest Holdings. TV5 and Brand New Media signed the joint venture in October 2014. This service is currently inactive due to budget cuts by TV5.

References

Website
 Official Website

TV5 Network